Pamela Irby (born September 8, 1964) is an American former rugby union player.

Irby also played for the Eagles sevens team and competed at the 2002 Hong Kong Women's Sevens.

References 

Living people
1964 births
Female rugby union players
American female rugby union players
United States women's international rugby union players